Spadikam is a 1995 Indian Malayalam-language action drama film written and directed by Bhadran and produced by R. Mohan through Shogun Films. The film stars Mohanlal and Thilakan with Urvashi, Spadikam George, K. P. A. C. Lalitha, Rajan P. Dev, Silk Smitha, Nedumudi Venu, Chippy, and V. K. Sreeraman in supporting roles. The film revolves around Thomas Chacko, who is also known by the sobriquet of Aadu Thoma, a ruffian estranged from his narcissistic father, Chacko Mash, upon failing to meet the latter's high expectations.

Development of the script took Bhadran three years to complete. It was based on three real-life ruffians who lived around Pala. The dialogues were written by Rajendra Babu. S. P. Venkatesh composed Spadikam's soundtrack and background score and J. Williams and S. Kumar were the cinematographers. Valsan and M. S. Mani were the film's art director and editor, respectively. The film was extensively shot in and around the town of Changanassery in Kottayam district, and was completed in 45 working days. Except for three days of shooting in Madras (now Chennai), Spadikam was filmed in Kerala.

Produced on a budget of ₹75 lakh, Spadikam was released on 30 March 1995 to critical acclaim, primarily for the performances of the lead cast, dialogues and cinematography. It was commercially successful and went on to become one of the highest-grossing films of the year; Spadikam completed a 100-day run in several centers. In addition to the Filmfare Award for Best Film – Malayalam, Spadikam won the Best Director and Best Actor at the 43rd Filmfare Awards South. Mohanlal also won the Kerala State Film Award Best Actor at the 27th Kerala State Film Awards. It was remade in  Telugu as Vajram, Tamil as Veerappu and in Kannada as Mr. Theertha.

Spadikam, which attained cult status, is considered instrumental in introducing thug life glorification of Mollywood  superstar s on screen. The film is also considered a milestone in the career of Mohanlal. The film along with Devaasuram (1993) indirectly marked the beginning of a new image of Mohanlal, that of an action hero that would appeal to the masses. The character of Aadu Thoma has over the years become a pop culture icon. 

In March 2020, during the 25th anniversary of the film, the plan to digitally enhance and a re-release it in theatres was announced. A digitally remastered 4K Dolby Atmos version of Spadikam was released theatrically on 9th February 2023.

Plot 
Thomas Chacko, or "Aadu Thoma" as he is widely known, is a quarry owner and a gangster who is the undefeated champion in his confrontations. He is the estranged son of retired school headmaster Chacko, the President's medal winner in mathematics. Thoma is a blemish for the respectable Chacko's reputation, and both never get along. His mother and sister, Jansy, are always left to choose sides, between the two of them; while Chacko's brother – Manimala Vakkachan, supports Thomas.

In the flashback, unlike his father, Thomas was not good at maths, but excelled at mechanical and electronic gadgetry. He made an AM radio receiver inside a soap case, at a time when phonographs were a fad. Thomas's talent astonished others, whereas his father was dismissive. He always compared his son to the best student in the class – Balu, adding to his pressure. His father asked his language teacher, Ravunni Master, to fail his paper, on the belief that only low grades will provoke him to study harder. When Thomas discovered this, he became outraged and burnt the malayalam answer paper in front of Ravunni Master and ran away from the village after stabbing Balu's hand with a compass in anger and sorrow. Later, Ravunni Master resigned from the school after being deeply saddened by the ill fate which happened to Thomas. Fourteen years later, he returned as a changed man, no longer a prodigy. He had become a quarry owner, lorry driver and a gangster. His father still despises him and professes to love his sister more, who lived up to his expectations.

Pookoya, a local baron, is the newly made enemy of Thoma, along with his sub-inspector friend, Kuttikkadan; for supporting Pookoya's daughter's relationship with a penniless teacher. Due to Thomas' relationship with a prostitute, revealed when the police shame him publicly, the arranged marriage of Jansy's, almost fails, further angering his father. This forces him to rat his son out to the police, on a later occasion, surprising even the S.I. with the act. The relationship between the two further declines after this incident, whereby entering into a fit of rage, Thomas cuts off the sleeves of his father's shirts. Chacko then repaints his son's lorry with the word, Chekuthan (devil), and plants a coconut tree in front of their house, naming it after Thomas, to insult him. But later, Thomas himself intervenes and restores the marriage alliance.

Meanwhile, Ravunni Master, who resigned after Thomas ran away from the village, comes back with his daughter, Thulasi, who was Thomas's childhood friend. Thulasi, the Vicar of the local church, and Vakkachan, try to mediate between the two, by trying to get Thomas invited by his father, to attend Jansy's wedding. Thomas, who attends the wedding, hoping for the better, is insulted further by his father. This finally makes Jansy stand against her father, stating she prefers her brother's small necklace to her father's high dowry, in her marriage. While the necklace was actually a gift from Thulasi, given by Thomas, this leads him to be deserted on the day of her wedding. Their mother, who was waiting for the wedding to take place, leaves him as well. With his pride struck the worst blow, Chacko is left all alone, to rethink on his actions and decisions.

Soon afterward, Thomas is stabbed by another goon, employed by Pookoya, in retaliation for helping his daughter elope with her lover, the teacher. Chacko secretly visits his son in the hospital, with regret. Coming back to health, Thomas' attempt at revenge is foiled, when Thulasi interferes. On learning that Thulasi loves him, he tries to prevent her. With her help, he tries to back out from his wrong outlook of life. Filled with the guilt of ruining his son's life, Chacko attempts suicide, which Thomas prevents. The two reconcile, thereafter. With a newfound joy, they, together, bring back his mother.

In a desperate attempt for revenge, Thomas's enemies unite against him. In a tragic turn of events, Chacko is shot by S.I. Kuttikadan, while targeting Thomas. Chacko succumbs to his injuries and dies in front of Thomas. He becomes enraged and attacks Kuttikadan. Thomas kills him and is taken into police custody, on charges of murder, leaving the helpless family and Thulasi in tears.

Cast

 Mohanlal as Thomas Chacko a.k.a. Aadu Thoma
 Thilakan as C. P. Chacko / Kaduva Chacko, a retired headmaster; Thoma's father
 Spadikam George as S.I. Kuttikkadan
 Urvashi as Thulasi
 Ashokan as Jerry, Jancy's husband
 Chippy as Jancy Chacko, Thoma's younger sister
 K. P. A. C. Lalitha as Mary / Ponnamma, Thoma's mother
 Rajan P. Dev as Manimala Vakkachan, Thoma's uncle
 Nedumudi Venu as Ravunni master, Thulasi's father
 Maniyanpilla Raju as Kunju Mohammad, Thoma's friend
 Karamana Janardanan Nair as Fr. Ottaplakkan
 N. F. Varghese as Pachu Pillai, Police constable and Balu's father
 Nizar as Chandy, Thoma's friend
 V. K. Sreeraman as Pookoya
 Silk Smitha as Laila
 Bindu Varapuzha as Mumthas
 Bahadoor as Kurup
 Kundara Johny as Maniyan, police constable
 Bheeman Raghu as S.I Somasekharan Pillai
 Roopesh Peethambaran as Thomas Chacko (childhood)
 Arya Anup as Thulasi (childhood)
 Indrans as Gafoor
 Spadikam Sunny (PN Sunny) as Torappan Bastian
 Paravoor Bharathan as Joseph
 Kanakalatha as Kuttikkadan's wife
 Sankaradi as Judge
 Chali Pala as Lukachan
 N. L. Balakrishnan
 Ajith Kollam

Production

Development
It took two to three years of preparation for the film, the screenplay was rewritten a few times. Producer R. Mohan wanted to name the film Aadu Thoma which he felt was more appealing to the public. But Bhadran wanted to name it Spadikam. The character Thomas Chacko / Aadu Thoma was based on three real-life ruffians who lived around Pala, one of them was known by the nickname Irattachankan (the man with two hearts), another one used to remove his mundu to wrap his opponent's head for hitting, and the third one had a downfall during his peaks period. The character Chacko Mash was based on four real-life characters Bhadran knew from his life, one was his own father who used to compare him with other kids, and the other three were his school teachers. In an interview, Bhadran said that Spadikam was inspired by his own life, but not that the character Aadu Thoma is him, but the film draws inspiration from his parents, village, priest, teachers, and disabilities of the education system at that time.

Casting 
Bhadran said he considered Mohanlal the best choice for the role because the character of Aadu Thoma as he was not only an alpha male but also had innocence and had self pity, he could emote all these characteristics perfectly. Shobana was first offered the role of Thulasi, but she could not sign the film as she had to leave for the United States for a dance program she already committed. Urvashi was cast in the role. Later Bhadran said that after watching the film he realized Urvashi was in fact the right choice for the role. 

Bhadran wanted Thilakan to play the role of Chacko, but it was difficult to hire him as they were not in good terms after their last film Idanazhiyil Oru Kaalocha (1987), since the two had a verbal dispute during the film's dubbing process, as Bhadran recalls, they came close to hitting each other. Spadikam was written three to four years after this incident. There were suggestions from the film crew to cast Nedumudi Venu for the role (who was later cast in another role). According to Bhadran, Thilakan acknowledged that it was a mistake on his part and they reconciled, thus he was able to cast him. Thilakan's son Shammi Thilakan later said that he was instrumental in Thilakan's casting, Bhadran used to make unsuccessful visits to see Thilakan while he was in the hospital, but was not permitted by Thilakan. Shammi then acted as an agent for Bhadran to present him the story of Spadikam while he was in a good mood.  

Nassar was originally fixed in the role of S.I Kuttikkadan, but he was unable to reach on schedule due to the unexpected extension of the schedule of another film he was filming. Bhadran found Spadikam George for the role accidentally when he saw him in front of a hotel he was staying. Impressed by his physique, Bhadran offered him the role, only then he realized George had already acted in a few films, he immediately agreed. Roopesh Peethambaran, who portrayed Thomas Chacko's childhood, himself asked for a role in the film when Bhadran visited their home, his father Peethambaran was Bhadran's friend. The man who played a goon named Thorappan Bastin hired to finish off Aadu Thoma was originally a cop. Santosh Sivan and Sabu Cyril were initially considered as cinematographer and art director respectively. However, they both unexpectedly left without citing a reason. This delayed shooting plans by a month and a half

Filming
The film was extensively shot in and around the town of Changanassery in Kottayam district. The house named Thekkedathu Mana was used as the house of Aadu Thoma and Chacko Mash. It was situated in Kudamaloor, Kottayam. The house was former Kerala chief minister E. M. S. Namboodiripad's mother's tharavadu. The scene in which Kuttikkadan arrest Thoma and Laila was filmed in Changanassery market. The climax scene was filmed in a quarry in Chennai. George was injured while performing a stunt scene where he jumps in front of a moving jeep driven by Mohanlal. Due to his weight, he could not roll away from the vehicle as expected and the tyre ran over his leg. The injury was not serious and he recuperated in a few days.

Music

The film's original songs and background score were composed by S. P. Venkatesh; lyrics for the songs were written by P. Bhaskaran. The soundtrack album was released by the label Wilson Audios. It consists of three songs. The song Ezhimala Poonchola was sung by K. S. Chithra and Mohanlal, Ormakal has a female and male version sung by Chithra and M. G. Sreekumar, respectively, Chithra also sung Parumala Cheruvile. The film's songs were chartbusters.

Release 
Spadikam was released on 30 March 1995. The film was certified with an U certificate by the Central Board of Film Certification.

Re-release
The film's digital remastering and restoration work was announced in March 2020. The original plan was to re-release the film in 4K Dolby Atmos in at least 100 theatres in Kerala during Onam 2020, but was halted after the COVID-19 pandemic. The remastering costed around ₹2 crore to complete and was done in Prasad Corporation in Chennai and S. P. Venktesh worked on the re-recording of the film, except for the portions where music comes along with dialogues as they could not dub the film again. In an interview Bhadran said that they will try to answer the doubt of audience that what happens to Aadu Thoma at the climax of the film. He also said that the remastered version will be three times better than the original in terms of audio-visual experience. The remastered version is 8.5 minutes longer than the original film as a few additional shots and also a scene introducing the character of Aadu Thoma. The new scene will feature 500 goats instead of the original 40.The film was distributed by newly formed company Geometrics. The remastering was done in Four Frames studio in Chennai. It is also notable that the hit song “ezhimalapoonchola” was re-recorded with KS Chithra and Mohanlal. The expenses for the re-release was around ₹2 cr. 

On 29 November 2022, Mohanlal announced through social media that the remastered version of Spadikam will finally hit on theatres on 9 February 2023. The remastered version's trailer was released on 6th February 2023 on the Matinee Now YouTube channel. Several of the film's key actors had passed away at the time of the film's re-release, namely: Thilakan, K. P. A. C Lalitha, Silk Smitha, Nedumudi Venu, Rajan P. Dev, N. F. Varghese, Sankaradi, Karamana Janardanan Nair, Paravoor Bharathan and Bahadoor.

On February 9, 2023, a digitally remastered version of the film with 4K resolution and Dolby Atmos sound was re-released on 150 theatres in Kerala and around 500 theatres world wide. The film received an overwhelming response from the audience resulting in a collection of ₹77 lakhs on the first day, setting new record for any re-release of an Indian film. 

Sajesh Mohan of Onmanorama wrote "What makes Aadu Thoma irresistible is the superlative performance of Mohanlal. In Spadikam, Mohanlal is at his entertaining best as the unruly son who returns home after 14 years of self-imposed exile. Bhadran and R Mohan understood the pulse of the audience then. And their concoction has only aged perfectly, proves the response inside the theatre. However, At a time when political correctness is the buzzword, the viewers would find themselves at a tug of war while rewatching some of the Malayalam runaway hits and cult classics of yesteryears. It is the same for Spadikam. 

Anna M. M. Vetticad of Firstpost wrote, "As I watched Spadikam this morning in a theatre in Delhi, I could not view it through a prism of nostalgia though. For as much as the storyline is gripping and substantial, the film is/was also committed to exaggeration and over-statement in the writing of situations and  characters, and the acting by several members of the cast (Indrans’ over-acting in a supporting role, for one, is embarrassing to say the least); and the writer-director’s mindset regarding women characters other than Jancy and Mary was appalling."

Reception

Box office 
It was a major commercial success. However, a later trade analysis by Nana cited The King (1995) as the highest grosser. Over the years, the film has achieved a cult following. Aadu Thoma has since then become one of the iconic characters in Malayalam cinema.

Critical response 
In 2018, Fahir Maithutty of The News Minute wrote, "There are mass action entertainers. There are beautiful family dramas. And then there is Spadikam." In 2023, while reviewing the digitally remastered version, Anna M. M. Vetticad of Firstpost wrote, "The unflagging energy of the narrative, its pace, the script’s push to leave children unfettered so that they may follow their dreams, the songs, the charismatic cast and a career-elevating performance by Mohanlal are what make this film memorable."

Accolades 
At the Kerala State Film Awards, Mohanlal won the Best Actor. The film won three awards at the Filmfare Awards South

Remakes
The film was remade in Telugu as Vajram (1995), in Tamil as Veerappu (2007) and in Kannada as Mr. Theertha (2010).

Cancelled sequel 
Bhadran has clarified that the film will not have a sequel. He recalled in an interview that producer Mohan once approached him offering a Mercedes Benz as remuneration for making a sequel to Spadikam, but he declined it. He said that the film ended with a closure for the story. The story was about a father who considers his son a devil and later realizes that his son was not a devil but pure as crystal. Thomas Chacko became Aadu Thoma because his father never understood his aspirations and dreams, instead compared him with other students and constantly snubbed him. Now that his father has acknowledged him, there is no reason for him to go back to his same despicable life. He has transformed back to Thomas Chacko from Aadu Thoma.

References

External links 
 

1995 films
1990s Malayalam-language films
Indian action drama films
Films shot in Palakkad
Films directed by Bhadran
Malayalam films remade in other languages
1995 action drama films